Starting blocks are a device used in the sport of track and field by sprint athletes to brace their feet against at the start of a race so they do not slip as they stride forward at the sound of the starter's pistol. The blocks also enable the sprinters to adopt a more efficient starting posture and isometrically preload their muscles in an enhanced manner. This allows them to start more powerfully and increases their overall sprint speed capability.

For most levels of competition, including the whole of high-level international competition, starting blocks are mandatory equipment for the start of sprint races. Their invention is credited to Australian Charlie Booth and his father in 1929. Prior to this, runners would dig holes in the dirt track. Trowels were provided at the start of races. This was not the most consistent or stable system. It also was destructive to the track surface with the holes having to be filled for subsequent runners. When George Simpson became the first person to run 9.4 seconds for the 100-yard dash in 1930, his record was disallowed because he used starting blocks.

Wood was the first material used, with some tracks having permanently-placed wooden starting blocks as built-in structures at the start line. Portable blocks were held by long metal spikes that needed to be pounded into the ground. These devices evolved into metal blocks. The common blocks of the 1960s were heavy and adjusted by screws that were frequently broken or became rusted over the years. Lighter-weight blocks were made of sheet metal. Nick Newton's innovative design uses cast aluminium.

The rubberized surfaces of new all-weather running tracks that became common starting in the 1970s, made the old blocks even less secure. Original Tartan tracks left long holes to secure the blocks but most tracks today require blocks to be held by small spikes similar to the ones used in shoes. Block slippage was common enough that it is an allowable loophole in the rules to recall the start of a race without calling a false start against an athlete whose blocks slip. In some amateur settings, such as high school track, since block slippage is much more common due to lower quality track surface material and/or starting blocks' spike quality, it is a commonly accepted practice to allow another person (usually a teammate) to sit on the ground behind the starting block and place their feet behind each block, using their leg power to further reduce the chance for the blocks to slip back when the runner launches.

Generally most races of 400 meters or shorter allow athletes to use starting blocks. Most runners in the 800 meters at the 1956 Olympics used starting blocks from a waterfall start.

Modern blocks used for world records now must have sensors that detect the pressure from the athlete and can be used to time their reaction to the starting gun. Athletes who react faster than one-tenth of a second can be charged with a false start and the race recalled.  Many also carry electronic speakers so the sound of the gun arrives at the ears of the athletes at exactly the same time.  Some races for hearing-impaired athletes have also used starting light systems, similar to motorsport's Christmas Tree.

See also
Nick Newton

References

Sprint (running)
Sport of athletics terminology
Sport of athletics equipment
Australian inventions